Jacques Droëtti was an Italian cyclist. He competed in the men's sprint event at the 1900 Summer Olympics.

References

External links
 

Year of birth missing
Year of death missing
Italian male cyclists
Olympic cyclists of Italy
Cyclists at the 1900 Summer Olympics
Place of birth missing
Place of death missing